South West Island may refer to:

 South West Island (Northern Territory), Australia
 South West Island (Newfoundland and Labrador), Canada
 Moekawa / South West Island, New Zealand

See also

 North East Island (disambiguation)
 North West Island
 South East Island
 South West Isle
 South West Penang Island
 South West Petrel Island
 Southwest Island